Alfred Jones (1819 in Liverpool, England – 1900 in New York City) was an American engraver. He also made portrait and landscape paintings. In the 1890s he was employed at the American Bank Note Company in New York. He was the artist and engraver of the 1890 Postage stamp that honored Thomas Jefferson.

Sources
The American Artists Bluebook

References

External links
 

1819 births
1900 deaths
American engravers
British emigrants to the United States